Eli Savit is an American lawyer, law professor, and politician. He is currently serving as the Prosecuting Attorney in Washtenaw County, Michigan. His areas of expertise include civil rights, education law, environmental protection, state and local government, and criminal-justice reform.

Prior to his election as Prosecuting Attorney, Savit served as senior legal counsel in the office of Detroit Mayor Mike Duggan, and as a law clerk to Supreme Court Justices Sandra Day O'Connor and Ruth Bader Ginsburg. Savit is also a lecturer at the University of Michigan Law School.

Early life and education
Savit was born and raised in Ann Arbor, Michigan. Savit attended Kalamazoo College, and was chosen as the senior class commencement speaker. Following graduation, Savit worked as an eighth-grade social studies teacher. He then attended law school at the University of Michigan, where he graduated magna cum laude and served as the Book Review Editor on the Michigan Law Review.

Legal career
After graduating from law school, Savit worked as a law clerk for Judge Carlos T. Bea on the United States Court of Appeals for the Ninth Circuit, and for Judge David S. Tatel on the United States Court of Appeals for the D.C. Circuit. He then worked as a litigator at Williams & Connolly in Washington, D.C., before being selected to work as a law clerk on the United States Supreme Court for Justices Sandra Day O'Connor (ret.) and Ruth Bader Ginsburg.

Following his Supreme Court clerkship, Savit returned to Michigan, and accepted an appointment as senior legal counsel in the Detroit Mayor's Office. In that capacity, Savit oversaw thousands of public-interest lawsuits against banks and for-profit corporations, including suits against tax-delinquent corporate landlords and against the opioid industry. Savit also led the City's legal efforts in civil-rights cases. He served as lead counsel for the City in Gary B. v. Snyder, a successful lawsuit which sought to establish that Detroit schoolchildren have been denied their fundamental right to literacy. He helped lead the negotiations which ultimately reached a settlement in that case.

In addition to his litigation work, Savit oversaw multiple legal matters for the City of Detroit. Among other things, he led the negotiating team that, in 2017, struck a $48 million community benefits agreement with the Canadian government related to the Gordie Howe International Bridge, to be spent on job training, health monitoring, and environmental remediation in Southwest Detroit. In 2018, he crafted an agreement with the ACLU and community partners to prevent home foreclosures throughout Detroit. He also served as the top education policy advisor for the City of Detroit.

Savit maintains an appointment at the University of Michigan Law School, where he teaches classes on public-interest litigation and state and local government. His academic work has been published in, among other journals, the Michigan Law Review and the Michigan Journal of Law Reform. Savit has authored pieces in multiple popular publications, including the New York Times, the Detroit News, Slate, The Hill, and MLive. He is also a frequent contributor to the legal blog Take Care, where he primarily writes about environmental issues.

In addition to his work for the City of Detroit, Savit has been a practicing environmental lawyer, representing the States of New Jersey and Maryland and the Commonwealth of Puerto Rico in lawsuits against companies such as Exxon and Shell. He also regularly serves as a pro-bono cooperating attorney for civil-rights groups in Michigan. He has litigated in the Michigan Supreme Court on behalf of the ACLU, the League of Women Voters, and the American Association of University Women. He also presented testimony to the Michigan Civil Rights Commission in support of Equality Michigan's successful effort to have the Commission declare that Michigan's civil rights law prohibits discrimination on the basis of sexual orientation and gender identity.

2020 election 

In May 2019, Savit announced his candidacy for Washtenaw County prosecutor as a Democrat, vowing to "end the era of mass incarceration".  Savit's platform included elimination of cash bail, more support for addiction and mental-health treatment programs, and eliminating racial and socioeconomic inequity in the justice system.

Less than two weeks after Savit announced his candidacy, 28-year incumbent prosecutor Brian Mackie announced his retirement. Savit was endorsed by multiple elected officials and community leaders, including former Michigan gubernatorial candidate Abdul El-Sayed, State Senator Jeff Irwin, and three previous chairs of the Michigan Democratic Party.

Savit ran for Washtenaw County Prosecutor against two Democratic primary opponents: Arianne Slay and Hugo Mack. Savit's campaign attracted national attention, and he secured endorsements from such high-profile national figures as Senator Bernie Sanders and musician and activist John Legend. On August 4, 2020, Savit won the Democratic primary for Washtenaw County Prosecutor, netting 41,673 votes (51%) compared to 35,380 (43%) for Slay and 5,504 (7%) for Mack.

Savit faced no Republican opposition in the November general election. On November 3, 2020, Savit won the general election, netting 159,998 votes (98.78%), the most votes of any candidate on the ballot in Washtenaw County.

Washtenaw County Prosecuting Attorney

On November 10, 2020, Savit announced that he would appoint Victoria Burton-Harris as Washtenaw County's Chief Assistant Prosecuting Attorney. Burton-Harris ran for Wayne County Prosecuting Attorney in the August 2020 Democratic primary against long-time incumbent prosecutor Kym Worthy. She is Washtenaw County's first female Chief Assistant Prosecuting Attorney.

In the fall of 2020, Savit announced that the Washtenaw County Prosecutor's Office would no longer prosecute the use or possession of psychedelic mushrooms or other entheogenic plants. Savit's announcement came on the heels of a City Council resolution in Ann Arbor—Washtenaw County's largest city—that deemed possession, use, and cultivation of entheogenic plants Ann Arbor's "lowest law enforcement priority".

Savit was sworn into office on January 2, 2021. During his first several weeks in office, Savit announced several major policy changes in the Washtenaw County Prosecutor's Office that garnered national attention.

On January 4, 2021, Savit announced that the Washtenaw County Prosecutor's Office would no longer seek to hold people pending trial on cash bail. Savit said that "whether someone is jailed should hinge on the threat they pose to the community, not their financial means." Under Savit's policy, prosecutors make individualized recommendations regarding pre-trial release based on the facts of each case, but do not consider a person's wealth when making that recommendation. The announcement of the policy made Washtenaw County the first prosecutor's office in Michigan not to rely on cash bail.

On January 12, 2021, Savit also announced that the Prosecutor's Office would no longer seek charges related to the use, possession, or small-scale distribution of marijuana or entheogenic plants, citing the racially disproportionate impact of the "war on drugs." The next day, Savit announced that the Prosecutor's Office would no longer charge the unauthorized use or possession of buprenorphine, a drug used to treat opioid use disorder. Savit cited research demonstrating that prosecution of buprenorphine leads people in recovery to "backslide" and use more dangerous drugs like fentanyl and heroin. He also noted that opioid overdose deaths fell by 50% when the prosecutor in Chittenden County, Vermont enacted a similar policy.

On January 14, 2021, Savit announced that his office would no longer prosecute consensual sex work, instead focusing on human trafficking, sexual assault, and sexual exploitation of children. Savit cited research demonstrating that the threat of prosecution makes sex workers and survivors of trafficking less likely to report crimes. The move was praised by national advocates as a "win for marginalized people" and trafficked persons.

Savit is partnering with the ACLU and the University of Michigan Law School on the "Prosecutor Transparency Project," a data partnership which will transparently identify racially disparate treatment in the Washtenaw County Prosecutor's Office. The partnership, which is the first of its kind in Michigan, will make publicly available data related to racial disparities in the justice system.

Electoral history

See also 
List of law clerks of the Supreme Court of the United States (Seat 8)

References

External links

Living people
Politicians from Ann Arbor, Michigan
Kalamazoo College alumni
University of Michigan Law School alumni
University of Michigan Law School faculty
Michigan lawyers
County officials in Michigan
Michigan Democrats
Year of birth missing (living people)
Jewish American people in Michigan politics
21st-century American Jews